Lycochoriolaus aurifer is a species of beetle in the family Cerambycidae. It was described by Linsley in 1970.

References

Lepturinae
Beetles described in 1970